The Congo women's national handball team is the national team of Republic of the Congo (from 1970 to 1991 the People's Republic of the Congo). It takes part in international handball competitions.

The team participated at the 1980 Summer Olympics, where they placed sixth.

They participated at the World Women's Handball Championship in 1982, 1999, 2001, 2007 and 2009.

Results

Olympic Games

1980 – 6th place

World Championship
1982 – 10th place
1999 – 22nd place
2001 – 22nd place
2007 – 17th place
2009 – 20th place
2021 – 23rd place
2023 – Qualified

African Championship
1976 – 2nd place
1979 – 1st place
1981 – 1st place
1983 – 1st place
1985 – 1st place
1987 – 3rd place
1989 – 3rd place
1991 – 3rd place
1992 – 2nd place
1994 – 4th place
1996 – 4th place
1998 – 2nd place
2000 – 2nd place
2002 – 6th place
2004 – 5th place
2006 – 3rd place
2008 – 3rd place
2010 – 5th place
2012 – 6th place
2014 – 5th place
2016 – 4th place
2018 – 5th place
2021 – 4th place
2022 – 3rd place

Team

Current squad
Squad for the 2021 World Women's Handball Championship.

Head coach: Younes Tatby

References

External links
IHF profile

National team
Handball
Women's national handball teams